The 2002 Cunningham by-election was held in the Australian electorate of Cunningham in New South Wales on 19 October 2002. The by-election was triggered by the resignation of the sitting member, the Australian Labor Party's Stephen Martin on 16 August 2002. The writ for the by-election was issued on 16 September 2002.

The by-election was notable as it was won by Michael Organ, the candidate for the Australian Greens, making Cunningham the first seat in the Australian House of Representatives to be won by a minor party since Jack Lang won Reid for his Lang Labor party in 1946, and the first seat in the House won by the Greens.

Background
Cunningham had been held by Labor since its creation 52 years previously, but a recent local government election for Lord Mayor of Wollongong had seen the Labor candidate lose to an independent, Alex Darling, causing concern in the ALP about their ability to hold the seat given the expectation of a significant protest vote against them. The ALP candidate preselected to replace Martin was Sharon Bird.

The Liberal Party of Australia received 28 percent of the primary vote at the previous election, they chose not to run a candidate in the by-election. Independent candidate David Moulds held Liberal Party membership.

Results

Stephen Martin resigned.

Aftermath
Although Labor received the highest primary vote, the Australian Greens candidate, Michael Organ, won the by-election on a 52.2 percent two-candidate preferred (2CP) vote. Asymmetrical preference flows in the absence of an official Liberal candidate contributed to Labor losing the seat, with their 2CP being reduced by 12.9 percent. Labor, Liberal and Green all contested Cunningham in the 2004 federal election, Labor won the seat back with a two-party preferred (2PP) vote of over 60 percent. Another example is the 2008 Mayo by-election. However, other factors attributed by some to the loss include Martin's premature departure, a messy preselection process for Bird, and discontent from the NSW Labor branch towards federal leader Simon Crean.

See also
 List of Australian federal by-elections

References

External links
 Cunningham (NSW) By-Election (19 October 2002) Results, Australian Electoral Commission

2002 elections in Australia
New South Wales federal by-elections